Cutt's Grant is a township in Coös County, New Hampshire, United States. The grant lies entirely within the White Mountain National Forest. As of the 2020 census, the grant had a population of zero.

In New Hampshire, locations, grants, townships (which are different from towns), and purchases are unincorporated portions of a county which are not part of any town and have limited self-government (if any, as many are uninhabited).

History 
The township is named after Thomas Cutts of Maine, who received a land grant from the New Hampshire state legislature in 1810.

Geography 
The grant encompasses the valley of the Dry River, a south-flowing tributary of the Saco River. The east and west boundaries roughly parallel the river, each about 1 mile away. The south end of the grant is where the Dry River enters the valley of the Saco River in Crawford Notch, and the north end is below Oakes Gulf on the southern slopes of Mount Washington.

Demographics 

As of the 2020 census, there were no people living in the grant.

References

Townships in Coös County, New Hampshire
Berlin, New Hampshire micropolitan area
Townships in New Hampshire